Baskin v. Bogan, the lead Indiana case challenging that state's denial of marriage rights to same-sex couples, was filed in federal district court on March 12, 2014, naming several government officials as defendants. Chief Judge Richard L. Young found for the plaintiffs on June 25. A three-judge panel of the U.S. Court of Appeals for the Seventh Circuit upheld the district court ruling in a unanimous decision on September 4.

District court proceedings
Lambda Legal filed Baskin v. Bogan in the U.S. District Court for the Southern District of Indiana on March 12, 2014, on behalf of three same-sex couples, all women. Their complaint named as defendants Indiana Attorney General Greg Zoeller and three county clerks, with one of the county clerks, Penny Bogan, in her official capacity, as the first-named defendant.

Emergency order
Baskin took precedence over the other Indiana marriage cases because one of the plaintiffs, Nikole Quasney, was terminally ill with ovarian cancer. As to her and her partner, U.S. District Judge Richard L. Young granted immediate relief, issuing a 28-day duration emergency order on April 10 and, after oral arguments on May 8 on a motion for summary judgment, a preliminary injunction directing the state parties to recognize the validity of the Quasney's  Massachusetts marriage. In doing so, the court temporarily withdrew the motion for as to the rest of the plaintiffs, with Judge Young reasoning it makes a stronger case for the terminally ill couple while also allowing the rest a resolution on the merits without causing undue confusion in case of an appeal.

The state filed an interlocutory appeal of this limited injunction on May 9, 2014, and that portion of the case was briefed in the U.S. Court of Appeals for the Seventh Circuit under the name of Baskin v. Zoeller, where it was docketed as No. 14-2037. Since the plaintiffs have since received a favorable ruling as to the broader issue of same-sex marriage in general, and that issue was appealed as well (see below), this more limited appeal was dismissed by the circuit court on July 14, 2014; with the emergency order remaining in place.

District court ruling
On June 25, 2014, the U.S. district court ruled as to the case of the remaining plaintiffs in Baskin, as well as the cases of Fujii and Lee. District Judge Richard L. Young found in favor of the plaintiff couples, granting them summary judgment and striking down Indiana's ban on same-sex marriage, while removing Indiana Governor Mike Pence from the lawsuit. Judge Young commented: 

The judge found that Indiana's ban violated the Fourteenth Amendment under both due process and equal protection theories and that the state had no rational basis for instituting its ban:

Absence of stay
The district court did not issue a stay, and as a result, Indiana clerks began issuing marriage licenses to same-sex couples the day of the ruling. As many as 800 to 1,000 marriage licenses may have been issued in Indiana before the Seventh Circuit brought license issuance to a halt two days later.

Court of Appeals proceedings
Indiana Attorney General Greg Zoeller appealed the District Court's decisions in Baskin v. Bogan, Fujii (appealed sub nom. Fujii v. Commissioner of the Indiana State Dep't of Revenue), and Lee (appealed sub nom. Abbott v. Lee.) On June 27, the Seventh Circuit sua sponte consolidated the cases for briefing and disposition. On the same day, a three-judge panel of the Seventh Circuit, U.S. Circuit Judges Richard Posner, Ann Claire Williams, and David F. Hamilton, granted an emergency stay of the prevailing same-sex marriage cases for the duration of their appeal. On July 2, the same panel granted a motion for one couple's marriage to be recognized immediately because one plaintiff's terminal illness, allowing Amy Sandler and Niki Quasney to become the first same-sex couple legally married in Indiana. The Seventh Circuit set a briefing schedule to be completed on September 19.

Dismissal of interlocutory appeal
As the Baskin plaintiffs had received a favorable final ruling in U.S. district court that was appealed to the Seventh Circuit (No. 14-2386), the previous interlocutory appeal pending there (No. 14-2037) was in essence duplicate litigation. On a joint motion from the plaintiffs and defendants, on July 14, 2014, the circuit court dismissed this appeal.

Consolidation of cases

On motion from the plaintiffs, the Seventh Circuit combined Baskin and its companion cases with a similar case on appeal from the Western District of Wisconsin, Wolf v. Walker. The circuit court also expedited proceedings by ordering completion of briefings by August 5. On July 11, the state defendants filed a motion in the circuit court to have the case heard en banc. Without responding to that motion, on July 14, the Seventh Circuit scheduled oral arguments before a three-judge panel. Judges Richard Posner, David Hamilton, and Ann Claire Williams heard arguments on August 26 in this case and Wolf v. Walker.

Court of Appeals ruling
On September 4, the Seventh Circuit, in a unanimous opinion authored by Judge Richard Posner, upheld the district court decision. He wrote:

Court of Appeals stay of ruling
On September 15, the Seventh Circuit granted a motion for a stay of ruling, to be in effect until this case or one like it is resolved at the Supreme Court.

Supreme Court denial of appeal
On October 6, 2014, the Supreme Court denied a writ of certiorari to the combined appeal with Wisconsin, letting the circuit court decision stand.

References

External links
Opinion, Baskin v. Bogan and Wolf v. Walker, September 4, 2014, Seventh Circuit Court of Appeals
 

LGBT rights in Indiana
Legal history of Indiana
United States same-sex union case law
2014 in United States case law
2014 in Indiana
United States Court of Appeals for the Seventh Circuit cases
2014 in LGBT history